Striamea is a genus of South American curtain web spiders that was first described by Robert Raven in 1981.  it contains only two species, both found in Colombia: S. gertschi and S. magna.

References

Dipluridae
Mygalomorphae genera
Spiders of South America